Paul Bjarnason (born 22 November 1944) is a Canadian weightlifter. He competed in the men's middle heavyweight event at the 1968 Summer Olympics.

References

1944 births
Living people
Canadian male weightlifters
Olympic weightlifters of Canada
Weightlifters at the 1968 Summer Olympics
Sportspeople from Vancouver
Pan American Games medalists in weightlifting
Pan American Games silver medalists for Canada
Weightlifters at the 1967 Pan American Games
20th-century Canadian people
21st-century Canadian people